Suominen is a Finnish surname meaning "Finland". Notable people with the surname include:

 Ilkka Suominen (1939-2022), Finnish politician
 Kim Suominen (born 1969), Finnish footballer
 Tuomas Suominen (born 1984), Finnish ice hockey player
 Veikko Suominen (1948–1978), Finnish ice hockey player

See also
Suominen Corporation

Finnish-language surnames